Hengen is a surname. Notable people with the surname include:

Jean Hengen (1912–2005), Luxembourgian Roman Catholic priest
Shannon E. Hengen, Canadian literary critic and academic
Thomas Hengen (born 1974), German footballer

See also
Bengen
Hentgen